In the field of mathematics known as convex analysis, the characteristic function of a set is a convex function that indicates the membership (or non-membership) of a given element in that set. It is similar to the usual indicator function, and one can freely convert between the two, but the characteristic function as defined below is better-suited to the methods of convex analysis.

Definition

taking values in the extended real number line defined by

Relationship with the indicator function

Let  denote the usual indicator function:

If one adopts the conventions that
 ; and
 ;

then the indicator and characteristic functions are related by the equations

and

Subgradient

Bibliography
 
Convex analysis